Jaroslava Havlová is a former Czechoslovak slalom canoeist who competed in the 1950s. She won two medals in the folding K-1 team event at the ICF Canoe Slalom World Championships with a gold in 1953 and a bronze in 1955.

References

External links 
 Jaroslava HAVLOVA at CanoeSlalom.net

Czechoslovak female canoeists
Possibly living people
Year of birth missing
Medalists at the ICF Canoe Slalom World Championships